Rani Venkatesan is an Indian politician and a past Member of the Legislative Assembly from Sathankulam Constituency.

References 

Indian National Congress politicians from Tamil Nadu
Living people
Year of birth missing (living people)